Elections were held in the state of New South Wales, Australia, on Saturday 24 March 1984. The Labor government led by Neville Wran won a fourth term in office, though with a reduced (if still sizeable) majority and a 7% swing against it.

As the two previous elections each saw the sitting Opposition Leader lose the election and failing to be elected to Parliament, the 1984 election saw Nick Greiner becoming the first Opposition Leader to lose an election and retain his seat since Pat Hills in  1974.

Independents Ted Mack and John Hatton retained their seats of North Shore and South Coast respectively. They were joined on the cross benches by a third independent and Bruce Duncan.

Duncan, a former National Country Party member, withdrew from the party in protest at their change to the National Party name. He ran on an "Independent Country Party" ticket and won his seat of Lismore.

At a 1981 referendum, voters had approved an increase in the maximum parliamentary term from three years to four.

Key dates

Results

Legislative Assembly

{{Australian elections/Title row
| table style = float:right;clear:right;margin-left:1em;
| title        = New South Wales state election, 24 March 1984
| house        = Legislative Assembly
| series       = New South Wales state election
| back         = 1981
| forward      = 1988
| enrolled     = 3,330,350
| total_votes  = 3,081,226
| turnout %    = 92.52
| turnout chg  = +1.37
| informal     = 74,316
| informal %   = 2.41
| informal chg = –0.67
}}
	

|}

{{bar box|float=right|title=Popular vote|titlebar=#ddd|width=600px|barwidth=410px|bars=

}}

Legislative Council

{{Australian elections/Title row
| table style = float:right;clear:right;margin-left:1em;
| title        = New South Wales state election, 24 March 1984
| house        = Legislative Council
| staggered    = yes
| enrolled     = 3,330,350
| total_votes  = 3,081,223
| turnout %    = 92.52
| turnout chg  = +1.38
| informal     = 205,275
| informal %   = 6.66
| informal chg = –0.18
}}
	

|}

Seats changing hands

Members listed in italics did not recontest their seats.

Post-election pendulum

See also
Candidates of the 1984 New South Wales state election

Notes

References

Sources cited

Elections in New South Wales
1984 elections in Australia
1980s in New South Wales
March 1984 events in Australia